Álvaro Marcelo García Linera (born 19 October 1962) is a Bolivian politician, sociologist, marxist theoretician, and former guerilla who served as the 38th vice president of Bolivia from 2006 to 2019. A member of the Movement for Socialism, in the early 1990s he was a leader of the Túpac Katari Guerrilla Army.

Political career 
In the early 1990s, García Linera was the leader of the Túpac Katari Guerrilla Army. In 1992, he was accused of armed uprising and arrested along with several other insurgents. He was released in 1997.

García was elected vice president as the running mate of Evo Morales in the 2005 presidential elections.
He is an advocate of nationalization of Bolivia's hydrocarbon industry. In 2005 interview, he said that hydrocarbons "would be the second unifying factor of this society in October, 2003" and that "the debates over hydrocarbons are playing with the destiny of Bolivia."
García wrote a monograph about the different political and social organizations that were a part of the political rise of the MAS and other indigenous factions, Sociología de los Movimientos Sociales en Bolivia (Sociology of Social Movements in Bolivia), which was published in 2005. Morales and Linera were both re-elected in the 2009 presidential elections.

In December 2010, Linera posted the cables mentioning Bolivia from the website WikiLeaks, which leaks information from classified sources and whistleblowers, on his official page. Linera said linking this negative information was intended to allow people to see “barbarities and insults” in Washington and to expose their "interventionist infiltration."
García Linera has defended the Law of the Rights of Mother Earth, saying that it is not intended as a means to hamper industrial development or mineral extraction. Private miners have disagreed with this stance, suggesting that the law allows the government to expropriate their operations without providing compensation and that it signals Bolivia is hostile to foreign investment.

García Linera had indicated his intention of leaving politics for teaching and writing in 2014, at the end of his term. However, he chose to run for re-election and was re-elected to a third term in 2014.

Linera ran as Morales' vice-president for a fourth time in October 2019. However, on 10 November 2019 he resigned with President Evo Morales following the 2019 Bolivian protests. He left Bolivia and travelled to Mexico together with Morales.

In November 2020, he returned to Bolivia after the socialists returned to power and Luis Arce was sworn in as new President of Bolivia.

Controversy 

In 2016 it was publicly denounced that Linera falsified his university degree and passed himself off as a "Licenciado" (a Degree similar to B.A. in the American system). In 2018, it was asked to the Prosecutor office to investigate Linera for this fact. Other complaints claim that Linera did not even have a high school diploma.

Personal life 
On 8 March 2012, García Linera publicly confirmed his engagement to Claudia Fernández Valdivia, a news anchor with Bolivian television station Red Uno. They were married in September 2012, holding an indigenous ceremony on Saturday the 8th and a Catholic one on Sunday the 9th.

Selected list of written works 
with Íñigo Errejón. Qué horizonte. Hegemonía, Estado y revolución democrática. 2020
Plebeian Power: Collective Action and Indigenous, Working-Class and Popular Identities in Bolivia. 2014
Sociología de los movimientos sociales en Bolivia, La Paz, Diakonia, Oxfam y Plural, 2004.
Procesos de trabajo y subjetividad en la formación de la nueva condición obrera en Bolivia, La Paz, Programa de las Naciones Unidas para el Desarrollo (pnud), 2000. Reproletarización.
"Espacio Social y estructuras simbolicas. Clase, dominación simbólica y etnicidad en la obra de Pierre Bourdieu." 2000
Nueva clase obrera y desarrollo del capital industrial en Bolivia (1952-1998), La Paz, Comuna y Muela del Diablo, 1999.
Las armas de la utopía, La Paz, Postgrado en Ciencias del Desarrollo (ci des), umsa, Umbrales y Punto Cero, 1996.
Forma valor y forma comunidad de los procesos de trabajo, La Paz, Quipus, 1995.
De demonios escondidos y momentos de revolución. Marx y la revolución social en las extremidades del cuerpo capitalista, La Paz, Ofensiva Roja, 1991.
Crítica de la nación y la nación crítica, La Paz, Ofensiva Roja, 1989.
Introducción al Cuaderno Kovalevsky de Karl Marx, La Paz, Ofensiva Roja, 1989.
Introducción a los estudios etnológicos de Karl Marx, La Paz, Ofensiva Roja, 1988.

References

1962 births
Living people
21st-century Bolivian politicians
Bolivian expatriates in Argentina
Bolivian expatriates in Mexico
Bolivian guerrillas
Bolivian Marxists
Bolivian people of Spanish descent
Bolivian prisoners and detainees
Bolivian sociologists
Evo Morales administration cabinet members
Marxist theorists
Movement for Socialism (Bolivia) politicians
National Autonomous University of Mexico alumni
People from Cochabamba
People imprisoned on charges of terrorism
Prisoners and detainees of Bolivia
Vice presidents of Bolivia